Tysta Mari is a Swedish punk band that takes its name from the walkway / arcade Tysta Marigången. The band is made up of Mike (vocals and bass), Adam (vocals and guitar), Alex (drums) and Andreas (guitar).

Discography

Albums

References

Swedish punk rock groups